Sandra Blázquez (born 23 January 1987) is a Spanish television actress. Throughout her career, she has starred in several long-running series, including Al salir de clase (1998), Física o Química (2009–2011), and Acacias 38 (2016–2017).

In addition to working as an actress, Blázquez runs an organization helping poor children in northern Kenya with her friend María Fábregas, who is a social educator.

Filmography 

Television
 Al salir de clase as Fabiola.
 La vida de Rita as Rosarito.
 Cambio de clase as Luna.
 Física o Química as Alma.
 Tierra de lobos as Luz.
  as María José.
 Acacias 38 as Huertas López.

References

External links

1987 births
Living people
Spanish child actresses
People from Madrid
Spanish television actresses
21st-century Spanish actresses